Henry William Engleheart VC (14 November 1863 – 9 August 1939) was an English recipient of the Victoria Cross, the highest and most prestigious award for gallantry in the face of the enemy that can be awarded to British and Commonwealth forces.

Details 
Engleheart was 36 years old, and a sergeant in the 10th Royal Hussars (Prince of Wales's Own), British Army during the Second Boer War when the following deed took place for which he was awarded the VC:

Further information 
Englehart was educated at Queen Elizabeth's Grammar School, Barnet.

He later achieved the rank of Quartermaster Sergeant.

The medal 
His Victoria Cross is displayed at The King's Royal Hussars Museum in Winchester.

References 

 Monuments to Courage (David Harvey, 1999)
 The Register of the Victoria Cross (This England, 1997)
Victoria Crosses of the Anglo-Boer War (Ian Uys, 2000)

External links 
Location of grave and VC medal (Woking Crematorium)
Angloboerwar.com

10th Royal Hussars soldiers
1863 births
1939 deaths
People from Blackheath, London
Second Boer War recipients of the Victoria Cross
British recipients of the Victoria Cross
People educated at Queen Elizabeth's Grammar School for Boys
British Army recipients of the Victoria Cross